This is a listing of the horses that finished in either first, second, or third place and the number of starters in the Woodward Stakes, an American Grade 1 race for three-year-olds and up, at 1-1/8 miles on dirt held at Saratoga Race Course in Saratoga Springs, New York. Runners who were subsequently named the American Horse of the Year are indicated in bold.  (List 1972–present)

A ‡ designates a Filly or Mare

References 

Belmont Park
Saratoga Race Course
Lists of horse racing results